Alberto Herreros Ros (born 20 April 1969) is a retired Spanish professional basketball player. He is considered to be one of the best Spanish basketball players and shooters of all-time. At a height of 2.00 m (6'6 ") tall, he played at the small forward position. He played with Estudiantes and Real Madrid. He still works for Real Madrid basketball.

Professional career
In 2005, Herreros made a three-point shot in the last seconds of the playoff finals of the Liga ACB, against TAU Cerámica, that gave his team Real Madrid, the win, and the Spanish League championship. It was his last game before his retirement as a professional basketball player.

During his pro career, he played 19,218 minutes (2nd most) in 654 games (7th most) in the Spanish ACB League. He is the Liga ACB's all-time leader in points scored (9,759) and 3-point field goals made (1,233).

National team career
Herreros was the 1998 FIBA World Championship's Top Scorer, and was named to the All-Tournament Team. In EuroBasket 1999, Herreros again became the Top Scorer of the tournament and was named to the All-Tournament Team, and reached, along with the Spanish team, the tournament's final, as they won the silver medal. He also won the silver medal at the EuroBasket 2003.

Post-playing career
After his basketball playing career ended, Herreros worked with Real Madrid in a management position.

References

External links

FIBA Archive Profile
FIBA Europe Profile
Euroleague.net Profile
Spanish League Profile 
Spanish League Archive Profile 

1969 births
Living people
Basketball players at the 1992 Summer Olympics
1998 FIBA World Championship players
Basketball players at the 2000 Summer Olympics
CB Estudiantes players
Liga ACB players
Olympic basketball players of Spain
Real Madrid Baloncesto players
Small forwards
Spanish men's basketball players
1990 FIBA World Championship players
Basketball players from Madrid
1994 FIBA World Championship players